The Corsican goat breed from the French island of Corsica is used primarily for the production of milk.

Sources
Corsican Goat

Goat breeds
Dairy goat breeds
Goat breeds originating in France